Ceretti is an Italian surname. Notable people with the surname include:

 Bill Ceretti (1912–1974), offensive and defensive lineman
 Catherine Rousselet-Ceretti (born 1943), French fencer
 Celso Ceretti (1844–1909), Italian supporter of Giuseppe Garibaldi,  internationalist anarchist and socialist politician
 Giulio Ceretti (1868–1934), Italian engineer and entrepreneur
 Stéphane Ceretti (born 1973), French visual effects supervisor
 Vittoria Ceretti (born 1998), Italian model

See also 

 Ceretto (disambiguation)

Italian-language surnames